Chair Transformation Number 20B is a 1996 abstract sculpture, by Lucas Samaras, in the National Gallery of Art Sculpture Garden.

See also
 List of public art in Washington, D.C., Ward 2

References

External links
Waymarking.com: Chair Transformation Number 20B
Bluffton.edu: National Gallery of Art Sculpture Garden, Chair Transformation Number 20B

1996 sculptures
Collections of the National Gallery of Art
National Gallery of Art Sculpture Garden
Abstract sculptures in Washington, D.C.
Bronze sculptures in Washington, D.C.
Chairs
Outdoor sculptures in Washington, D.C.